Carmen, officially the Municipality of Carmen,  is a 2nd class municipality in the province of Bohol, Philippines. According to the 2020 census, it has a population of 49,191 people.

The town of Carmen, Bohol celebrates its fiesta on January 17, to honor the town patron Saint Anthony de Abbot.

History

Carmen was originally part of the municipality of Bilar and called Imbaya, after the name of a stream in the settlement. During the Spanish time, it was inhabited by not more than fifty families. In 1868, the people of Carmen petitioned for its independence since its population grew to an unprecedented number.  The town of Carmen was founded on 1 March 1869 by final order of Governor General Jose de la Gandara and renamed at the same time in honor of the Lady of Carmel of Spain.  In 1874, the town of Carmen had its separate parish with Father Pedro Nolasco San Juan as the first parish priest.

Due to the influence of Spanish culture and tradition, all barangays of Carmen have a patron saint as well as a Spanish name, who are celebrated in an annual barangay fiesta.

In World War II, Carmen served as the stronghold of the guerrilla resistance movement and the local civil government because of its strategic location. Even at present, the municipality still serves the same purpose of being the provincial center of dynamic activities.

In 2013 a magnitude 7.2 earthquake shook Central Visayas region, with its epicenter within Carmen municipality.

Geography

Carmen is located in the heart of Bohol Island. The Chocolate Hills, composed of 1,776 cone-shaped karst hills, are a major geographic landmark in Carmen. The origin of its name comes from the fact that the hills turns brown in the hot summer days.

Barangays

Carmen comprises 29 barangays:

Climate

Demographics

Economy

References

External links

 [ Philippine Standard Geographic Code]
 Provincial Government of Bohol
 Latest Carmen Bohol News
 Carmen

Municipalities of Bohol